The Provincial Freeman was a Canadian weekly newspaper founded by Mary Ann Shadd that published from 1853 through 1857. She was married to Thomas F. Cary in 1856, becoming Mary Ann Shadd Cary. It was the first newspaper published by an African-American female and Canada's first by a female of any ethnicity. The paper's motto was "Devoted to anti-slavery, temperance and general literature."

History 
Mary Ann Shadd was born in Wilmington, Delaware in 1823. After the passing of the Fugitive Slave Act of 1850, Shadd emigrated to Canada with her brother, Isaac Shadd, in 1851.

Shadd began The Provincial Freeman in 1853. Aware that her name would affect the number of people reading the paper because of the gender expectations of the 19th century society, she persuaded Samuel Ringgold Ward, a black abolitionist who published several abolitionist newspapers, including Impartial Citizen, to help her publish the newspaper. She also enlisted the help of Rev. Alexander McArthur, a white clergyman. Their names were featured on the masthead, but Mary Ann was involved in all aspects of the paper. Shadd left her full name off the masthead as both writer and editor, to hide her involvement. Shadd identified herself on the masthead with only her first two initials and by listing herself as "publishing agent."

The paper published in Windsor, Ontario between 1853 and 1854, in Toronto between 1854 and 1855, and in Chatham, Ontario from 1855 to 1857.

In 1854, Mary Ann Shadd changed the masthead to feature her own name, rather than McArthur and Ward. She also hired her sister to help edit the paper. There was intense criticism of the change, and Mary Ann was forced to resign the following year.

The paper's final issue was published on September 20, 1857.

Newspaper content
The Provincial Freeman's first issue was published in Windsor, Ontario on March 24, 1853. It was the second newspaper in Canada to present the views and concerns of the Black community. The paper was written for abolitionists in British North America, now Canada, and northern United States.

Women's rights were a founding principle of The Provincial Freeman—Shadd even wrote a column on it.

Contributors
Isaac Shadd, Mary Ann's brother, managed the daily business affairs of the newspaper. Isaac was a committed abolitionist, and would later host gatherings to plan the raid on Harper's Ferry at his home. Her brother and sister, Isaac and Amelia edited the paper. Abolitionists Martin Delany, William P. Newman, Samuel Ringgold Ward and H. Ford Douglass contributed to the newspaper periodically.

Mary Ann lectured throughout Canada and the United States to increase subscriptions, as well as raise funds to support runaway slaves.

Legacy 
The impact of African-American newspapers from 1850–1860 was significant in the abolitionist movement. However, it was challenging to sustain publication. Publishers like Shadd undertook their work because of a commitment to education and advocacy, and used their newspapers as a means to influence opinion. They had to overcome financial, political and social challenges to keep their papers afloat.

Carol B. Conaway writes in "Racial Uplift: The Nineteenth Century Thought of Black Newspaper Publisher Mary Ann Shadd Cary" that these newspapers shifted the focus from whites to blacks in an empowering way. She writes that whites read these newspapers to monitor the dissatisfaction level of the treatment of African Americans and to measure their tolerance for continued slavery in America.

Black newspapers often modeled their newspapers on mainstream white publications. According to research conducted by William David Sloan in his various historical textbooks, the first newspapers were about four pages and had one blank page to provide a place for people to write their own information before passing it along to friends and relatives. He goes even farther to discuss how the newspapers during these early days were the center of information for society and culture.

Memorial 
A statue of Mary Ann Shadd Cary and a historic plaque is located at BME Freedom Park in Chatham-Kent.

See also 

 Abolitionist publications

References

External links 
Provincial Freeman - digitized from microfilm from the University of Windsor library collection.

African-American newspapers
Abolitionist newspapers
Newspapers published in Windsor, Ontario
Defunct newspapers published in Canada
Newspapers published in Toronto
Black Canadian organizations
African-American Roman Catholicism